Otranto is a census-designated place located in Otranto Township in northwestern portion of Mitchell County in the state of Iowa. As of the 2010 census the population was 27.

Demographics

References

Populated places in Mitchell County, Iowa